Noel Fox (born 1940) was an Irish Gaelic footballer who played for club side St. Vincent's and at inter-county level with the Dublin senior football team.

Career

Fox first came to prominence on the inter-county scene during a three-year stint with the Dublin minor team. He won an All-Ireland Championship in his final year in 1958 when Mayo were beaten in the final. Promotion to the Dublin senior team followed. Fox won back-to-back Leinster Championship medals in 1962 and 1963, and he was part of the Dublin squad that won the 1963 All-Ireland final by defeating Galway. He ended his career with a third provincial winners' medal in 1965.

Honours

Dublin
All-Ireland Senior Football Championship: 1963
Leinster Senior Football Championship: 1962, 1963, 1965
All-Ireland Minor Football Championship: 1958
Leinster Minor Football Championship: 1958

References

1940 births
Living people
St Vincents (Dublin) Gaelic footballers
Dublin inter-county Gaelic footballers